Charles Armington Robins (December 8, 1884 – September 20, 1970) was an American physician and the 22nd governor of Idaho.

Early years
Born in Iowa at Defiance in Shelby County, at age four Robins moved west with his family to Colorado, settling at La Junta in Otero County. He graduated in 1907 from William Jewell College in Liberty, Missouri, then taught high school in Missouri, Colorado, Montana, and Mississippi. He entered medical school in 1913 at Rush Medical College of the University of Chicago, working various night jobs to put himself through, and earned his MD in 1917.

Career
During World War I, Robins entered the Medical Corps of the U.S. Army in August 1918 as a first lieutenant. and ended his military service on December 16, 1918. Given free transportation by the Great Northern Railway to look at two towns that needed physicians, he left Chicago the following week. He arrived in St. Maries, Idaho, on Christmas Eve and chose it over Three Forks, Montana, and stayed for 28 years, until elected governor. For a generation, Robins delivered nearly every baby in Benewah County.

Robins was a member of the state senate for four terms, from 1939 to 1947. He ran for governor in 1946, and was the first in Idaho to be elected to a four-year term; all previous governors had been elected to two-year terms. He handily defeated the incumbent, Arnold Williams, who had gained the office when his predecessor, Charles Gossett, resigned to be immediately appointed by Williams to a vacant seat in the U.S. Senate.

Williams was elected as lieutenant governor in 1944, and became governor in late 1945.

The new four-year term disallowed self-succession (re-election) until 1958, so Robins and his Republican successor in 1950, Len Jordan, served single four-year terms and retired from office. The state constitution was later amended, after receiving voter approval in the 1956 general election.

Robins was a delegate to the Republican National Convention in 1948 while in office as governor.  Not allowed to compete for a second term in 1950, he ran for the U.S. Senate, but was defeated in the August primary by Herman Welker.

After leaving the governor's office in 1951 at age 66, Robins moved his residence from St. Maries to Lewiston and became the medical director of the north Idaho district of the Medical Service Bureau, later known as Regence Blue Shield.

Personal
Robins married Marguerite Sherman Granberry (1892–1938) on July 8, 1919, in Hazlehurst, Mississippi; she died at age 46 in May 1938 and they had no children. He married Patricia Simpson (1914–1993) of St. Maries, one of his nurses, in November 1939 and they had three daughters: Patricia, Paula, and Rebecca.

He was a member of the American Legion, the American Medical Association, Phi Gamma Delta fraternity, Nu Sigma Nu professional fraternity, and Freemasons.

Death
Robins died at age 85 in Lewiston on September 20, 1970, and is interred at Lewis Clark Memorial Gardens in Lewiston.

References

External links 
 
National Governors Association: biography
Political Graveyard – C.A. Robins
Ancestry.Com
The Nicholas Robbins Family - Charles A. Robins
Idaho Genealogy Trails

1884 births
1970 deaths
Republican Party governors of Idaho
Republican Party Idaho state senators
People from Lewiston, Idaho
People from Shelby County, Iowa
United States Army personnel of World War I
United States Army Medical Corps officers
Rush Medical College alumni
William Jewell College alumni
20th-century American politicians
People from La Junta, Colorado
People from St. Maries, Idaho
Physicians from Idaho
Physicians from Colorado
20th-century American Episcopalians
Military personnel from Iowa
Military personnel from Colorado